John Getty could refer to: 

John Getty (footballer) (born 1918), Scottish footballer 
J. Arch Getty (John Archibald Getty III, born 1950)

See also
John Paul Getty (disambiguation)